News from a Personal War is a 1999 Brazilian documentary film by João Moreira Salles and Kátia Lund, about the urban violence-ridden slums in Rio de Janeiro.

Plot
Based on interviews with characters involved in the trafficking routine, the film contrasts the lines of criminals, police and residents of the Santa Marta favela in a daily war that knows no winners, and debates the way society deals with violence.

Cast 
Nilton Cerqueira - Self
Carlos Luis Gregório - Self
Paulo Lins - Self
Hélio Luz - Self
Rodrigo Pimentel - Self
Itamar Silva - Self

Promotion
News from a Personal War had its premiere on a Brazilian pay television channel in 14 of April 1999. In the following year, it was included in the Official Selection at the São Paulo It's All True – International Documentary Film Festival and won the prize for Best Documentary (Brazilian Competition Award).

The film made subsequent appearances at the Amsterdam International Documentary Film Festival, San Francisco Independent Film Festival and Vancouver International Film Festival, all these screened in 2002.

Accolades

References

External links
 

1999 documentary films
1999 films
Brazilian documentary films